Endere is a genus of millipedes in the family Cambalidae. There is at least one described species in Endere, E. disora.

References

Further reading

 
 
 
 

Spirostreptida
Millipede genera